The 2019–20 Charlotte 49ers men's basketball team represented the University of North Carolina at Charlotte in the 2019–20 NCAA Division I men's basketball season. The 49ers, led by second-year head coach Ron Sanchez, played their home games at the Dale F. Halton Arena in Charlotte, North Carolina as members of Conference USA. They finished the season 16–13, 10–8 in C-USA play to finish in fourth place. They were set to be the No. 4 seed in the C-USA tournament. However, they C-USA Tournament was canceled amid the COVID-19 pandemic.

Previous season
The 49ers finished the 2018–19 season 8–21 overall, 5–13 in C-USA play to finish in 13th place. Since only the top 12 teams are eligible, they failed to qualify for the C-USA tournament.

Offseason

Departures

Incoming transfers

2019 recruiting class

2020 Recruiting class

Roster

Schedule and results

|-
!colspan=12 style=| Exhibition

|-
!colspan=12 style=| Non-conference regular season

|-
!colspan=12 style=| Conference USA regular season

|-
!colspan=9 style=| Conference USA tournament
|-

|-

Source

Notes

References

Charlotte 49ers men's basketball seasons
Charlotte 49ers
Charlotte 49ers men's basketball
Charlotte 49ers men's basketball